There have been two baronetcies created for persons with the surname Colman, both in the Baronetage of the United Kingdom.

The Colman Baronetcy, of Gatton Park in the parish of Gatton in the County of Surrey, was created in the Baronetage of the United Kingdom on 26 November 1907 for Jeremiah Colman. He was Chairman of J. & J. Colman Ltd, mustard, cornflour and starch manufacturers, of Norwich and London, and also served as a Lieutenant of the City of London.

The Colman Baronetcy, of Reigate in the County of Surrey, was created in the Baronetage of the United Kingdom on 29 January 1952 for Nigel Colman, Conservative Member of Parliament for Brixton from 1927 to 1945. The title became extinct on his death in 1966.

Colman baronets, of Gatton Park (1907)

Sir Jeremiah Colman, 1st Baronet (1859–1942)
Sir Jeremiah Colman, 2nd Baronet (1886–1961)
Sir Michael Jeremiah Colman, 3rd Baronet (born 1928) married Judith Jean Wallop William-Powlett. They live in Tadley. Lady Colman is patron of a number of charities including SeeAbility  and Basingstoke & District Disability Forum.

Colman baronets, of Reigate (1952)

Sir Nigel Claudian Dalziel Colman, 1st Baronet (1886–1966)

References

Kidd, Charles, Williamson, David (editors). Debrett's Peerage and Baronetage (1990 edition). New York: St Martin's Press, 1990.

Baronetcies in the Baronetage of the United Kingdom
Extinct baronetcies in the Baronetage of the United Kingdom